Carl Johan Söderberg (born 12 October 1985) is a Swedish professional ice hockey forward for the Malmö Redhawks of the Swedish Hockey League (SHL). He was drafted by the St. Louis Blues in the second round, 49th overall, of the 2004 NHL Entry Draft, and has previously played with the Boston Bruins, Colorado Avalanche, Arizona Coyotes and Chicago Blackhawks in the National Hockey League (NHL).

Playing career

Sweden
Söderberg played as a youth with hometown club, the Malmö Redhawks. While showing an offensive prowess in the Under-18 Allsvenskan he first played in the J20 SuperElit level with the Redhawks in the 2001–02 season, appearing in nine games. In the following season, he was a regular in the J20 placing second amongst the Redhawks in scoring with 35 points in 28 games.

In the 2003–04 season, Söderberg was dominant in the J20, helping Malmö to a silver medal finish by leading the league with 48 points in 27 games. During the season, he was elevated to make his professional debut in the Elitserien with the Malmö Redhawks, contributing with two points in 24 games. Soderberg showing size and skill was drafted in the second round, 49th overall in the 2004 NHL Entry Draft by the St. Louis Blues.

Söderberg continued to play between the J20 and Elitserien in the 2004–05 season. While playing in limited minutes, Söderberg added 5 assists in 38 games in the SEL. During the year he accepted a loan spell to the HockeyAllsvenskan with Mörrums GoIS IK, contributing with 11 points in 14 games. Unable to help Malmö avoid relegation from the Elitserien at season's end, Söderberg became an impact player at the Allsvenskan level in the following 2005–06 season with the Redhawks, scoring at point-per-game pace with 39 points.

Upon helping Malmö return to the top division on the first time of asking, Söderberg was signed to a lucrative three-year entry-level contract with the St. Louis Blues on 1 June 2006. Söderberg moved to North America over the summer, and appeared in his first training camp with the Blues. Söderberg was to be assigned to the Blues American Hockey League affiliate, however struggling to adapt to his new country and dealing with homesickness, refused and was returned on loan to continue with Malmö in the SEL.

In the 2006–07 season, Söderberg was amongst the club's leading scorers in a break out season in the SEL with 30 points in 31 games before he sustained a serious injury in receiving a high-stick to his left eye, suffering a detached retina. The injury left Söderberg legally blind in his left eye. With the injury ruling him out for the remainder of the season and unable to practice in the off-season, Söderberg was traded by the Blues to the Boston Bruins in exchange for Hannu Toivonen on 23 July 2007.

With the intent to continue his recovery in Sweden with Malmö, Söderberg was loaned by the Bruins for the remainder of his entry-level contract. Learning to adapt to being left with 20–80 vision in his left eye, Söderberg compensated with greater use of other senses to seamlessly continue his scoring acumen in the HockeyAllsvenskan. At the conclusion of his NHL deal, and with the Bruins retaining his rights, Söderberg opted to remain loyal with his hometown club in Malmö, who were also threatened bankruptcy, for a further two seasons.

After 10 seasons within the Redhawks organization, with the club unable to earn promotion from the HockeyAllsvenskan, Söderberg in order to advance his career agreed to a one-year deal with Linköpings HC of the Elitserien on 1 April 2011. In the 2011–12 season, Söderberg made an instant impact with Linköpings with eight points in six games and was promptly given an improved three-year contract extension on 28 September 2011. He completed the season with 35 points in 42 games, placing second among forwards, unable to help the club propel into the post-season. Söderberg improved on his successful first season with Linköpings, leading the club in scoring with 60 points, and the league with 31 goals in 54 games. In the post-season, he was given a 7 match suspension, reduced to 4, for a hit on former NHL player Per Ledin on 14 March 2013. He was limited to 6 games in the post-season, ending his Elitserien career.

NHL

Boston Bruins
Upon Linköpings exit in the post-season, with the ambition to embark on a NHL career, Söderberg settled a protracted dispute with the Swedish Ice Hockey Association. He was released by Linköpings HC and was signed by the Boston Bruins to a three-year, one-way contract on 13 April 2013. After he was granted a visa, Söderberg joined the Bruins for the homestretch of the 2012–13 season. He made his NHL debut against the Pittsburgh Penguins on 20 April 2013. In only his second game with the Bruins, Söderberg assisted on the first goal (scored by Jaromír Jágr) of a 3–0 win over the Florida Panthers on 21 April, for his first NHL point.

He scored his first NHL goal later in the year, on 31 October, beating Jonas Hiller as the first Bruins goal of a 3–2 home shootout victory over the Anaheim Ducks.

Colorado Avalanche
On 25 June 2015, just prior to becoming an unrestricted free agent on 1 July, Söderberg was traded by the Bruins to the Colorado Avalanche in exchange for Boston's own sixth-round pick in the 2016 NHL Entry Draft previously traded to Colorado. The next day, on 26 June, he subsequently signed a five-year, $23.75 million contract with the Avalanche, which includes a full no-trade clause for the first two years and a limited no-trade afterward.

Arizona Coyotes
On 25 June 2019, with a year remaining on his contract, Söderberg was traded by the Avalanche to the Arizona Coyotes in exchange for Kevin Connauton and a 2020 third-round draft pick. In the 2019–20 season, Söderberg played in a top-nine forward role season with the Coyotes, notching 35 points in 70 regular season games. His 17 goals shared third among Coyotes' skaters. Söderberg helped the Coyotes qualify for the post-season recording a goal and an assist in nine games, before suffering a first-round series defeat to former club, the Colorado Avalanche.

Chicago Blackhawks
As a free agent from the Coyotes, Söderberg was signed approaching the delayed 2020–21 season on a one-year, $1 million contract with the Chicago Blackhawks on 26 December 2020.

Return to Colorado
At the trade deadline on 12 April 2021, Söderberg was traded by the Blackhawks back to the contending Colorado Avalanche in exchange for prospects Josh Dickinson and Ryder Rolston. Appearing in a bottom six role with the Avalanche, Söderberg collected 2 assists through the final 11 regular season games. Beginning the playoffs as a healthy scratch, Söderberg drew into the lineup in the third game of the opening round series against the St. Louis Blues registering an assist. Helping the Avalanche sweep the Blues, Söderberg later scored his first goal in his return to Colorado during the second round series game 3 loss to the Vegas Golden Knights on 4 June 2021. Unable to retain his role through the series, Söderberg finished as a healthy scratch in the 6 game defeat to the Golden Knights, ending with 2 points in 4 games.

Return to Sweden
As an impending free agent, Söderberg effectively opted to conclude his career in the NHL after nine seasons and 597 games, returning to his native Sweden and signing a two-year contract with hometown club, Malmö Redhawks of the SHL, on 17 June 2021.

International play

Söderberg was first selected for the Swedish team at the International stage for the 2003 IIHF World U18 Championships in Russia. He contributed with 2 goals in 6 games before reaching the quarterfinals and suffering an 8–1 defeat against Canada, to finish in fifth place. When the 2005 World Junior Championships came to the United States, Soderberg was again selected to the Swedish squad. Sweden went out to the host nation in the quarterfinals with an 8–2 drubbing. Soderberg contributed offensively as the team's second-best scorer with six points in six games.

On 6 September 2008, Söderberg made his senior national team debut featuring in a friendly match against Finland. On 9 April 2013, Söderberg reached a multi-year agreement with the Boston Bruins and secured his release from his Swedish team, Linköpings HC. On 11 April 2013, however, the Swedish Ice Hockey Association (SIHF) blocked the release of Söderberg to the NHL in an attempt to secure his position on the Swedish national team for the upcoming 2013 IIHF World Championships being co-hosted by the country. In the following days, Söderberg refused to play for Sweden.

Söderberg finally made his return to the national team after he was selected to take part in the revamped 2016 World Cup of Hockey in Toronto, Ontario at the Air Canada Centre. He made his senior debut in the opening round robin game in a 2–1 victory over Russia on 18 September 2016. In four games he contributed with 1 assist before suffering a shock semi-final defeat to Team Europe.

Career statistics

Regular season and playoffs

International

References

External links
 

1985 births
Living people
Arizona Coyotes players
Boston Bruins players
Chicago Blackhawks players
Colorado Avalanche players
Linköping HC players
Malmö Redhawks players
Sportspeople from Malmö
St. Louis Blues draft picks
Swedish expatriate ice hockey players in the United States
Swedish ice hockey centres